Boris Korneyevich Kolokolov (born February 23, 1943) is a Russian professional football coach and a former player.

External links
 Career summary by KLISF

1943 births
Living people
Soviet footballers
FC Luch Vladivostok players
Russian football managers
FC Luch Vladivostok managers
Association football forwards
Association football midfielders